Henriette Kjær Nielsen (born 6 January 1970) is a Danish former professional tennis player.

Kjær Nielsen was a member of the Denmark Federation Cup team between 1988 and 1992, featuring in a total of seven ties, all as a doubles player. Most notably, in 1988 she teamed up with Tine Scheuer-Larsen to win the deciding rubber against Argentina's Bettina Fulco and Mercedes Paz, which gave Denmark a berth in the World Group quarter-finals.

ITF Circuit finals

Doubles: 6 (5–1)

References

External links
 
 
 

1970 births
Living people
Danish female tennis players